Trần Văn Thủy is an acclaimed Vietnamese documentary film director. He has directed more than twenty documentary films on a wide variety of themes.

His work has often been a center of controversy in Vietnam; his 1982 film Hanoi In Whose Eyes, and his 1985 film The Story of Kindness, were both banned for a number of years by the Vietnamese government because each had content that was implicitly critical of the regime. Nonetheless, due in large measure to the success of his work at international film festivals, Thủy was able to continue working for the Government Cinema department as a creator of greatly significant films, including A Story From the Corner of the Park (1996), and The Sound of a Violin at Mỹ Lai (1999).

Biography
Trần Văn Thủy was born in 1940 in Nam Định, Vietnam. His father was Trần Văn Vỵ (1902–1975), an automotive mechanic and functionary in the French protectorate government who was personally supportive of the revolutionary Việt Minh. His mother was Đỗ Thị Hiếu (1917–2015). He was the second of seven children. In 1949, his elder brother Vĩnh was killed by French fire in the course of a sweep operation in Hải Hậu, a rural district in Nam Định Province where the family had taken refuge. Thủy as a result became the eldest son in the family. During his childhood he became an avid swimmer, a skill that later on was to prove of supreme importance to his survival during his years as a combat photographer. He was educated in French schools until 1954, when he turned fourteen. According to Тhủy, his father Tràn Văn Vỵ was an extremely humane man who made many efforts to help people in trouble, and Thủy attributes his own strong sense of social responsibility, and his activities as a philanthropist, to the influence of his father. After 1954 his family had a difficult time because Thủy's father had worked for the French. None of Thủy's brothers and sisters were allowed to enter colleges, in spite of achieving high scores in entrance examinations.

After high school Thủy enrolled in a museum course in anthropology organized by the Ministry of Culture, and in 1960 went out to the mountains in the extreme northwest of Vietnam to make ethnographic studies of small groups of minority peoples such as the Tổng lượng and Khu Sung. In 1965, he made his way back, partly on foot, to Hanoi, in order to study at the Cinema Academy, a subsidiary of the government Cinema Department. His training was supposed to consist of a two-year curriculum concluding in 1967, but after only one year, he and number of fellow students were recruited to go south as combat journalists and photographers.

Thủy then worked as a war journalist in Military District V (a region around Quảng Đà) from 1966 to 1969, filming scenes of combat while suffering from extreme privation and danger. In 1969, gravely ill and exhausted, he made his way back north, carrying on his back the canisters of film that he had shot in the south. These rolls of film later became his first finished work: “My Land and My People.”

In 1972, Trần Văn Thủy went to the USSR to study directing at the Moscow Film College under Roman Karmen (1906–1978), a renowned Soviet documentary filmmaker who admired Thủy's first film, My Land and My People, and warmly supported Thủy's aspirations. After returning to Vietnam from the Soviet Union in 1977 Thủy worked for the Vietnam Central Documentary Film Unit under the Ministry of Culture, and during several sojourns abroad, worked as well with Britain's Channel 4 and Japan's NHK.

Since 1992, Trần Văn Thủy has put much effort into charitable work in Hải Hậu, a rural region in Nam Định Province, where the local people are for the most part subsistence-level rice farmers. Raising funds through organizations such as “Friends of Trần Văn Thủy,” Thủy has provided the wherewithal for the villagers to build roads, bridges, and schools.

Trần Văn Thủy's films have received widespread acclaim. The honors he has received include the Golden Dove Prize and the Silver Dove Prize at the Dok Leipzig film festival, the Silver Lotus Prize and Best Director Prize at the Vietnam Film Festival. He was awarded the Best Documentary Prize at the Asia Pacific Film Festival in year 2000 for The Sound of the Violin in Mỹ Lai.

Filmography
 Những Người Dân Quê Tôi (My Land and My People); 1970
 Nơi Chúng Tôi Đã Sống (The Place Where We Lived; Russian: Там Где Мы Жили); 1977
 Phản Bội (Betrayal); 1980
 Hà Nội Trong Mắt Ai (Hanoi in Whose Eyes); 1982
 Chuyện Tử Tế (On Being Kind; often referred to as “The Story of Kindness”) 1985
 Có Hai Tục Ngữ (Làm ở Liên Xô) 1986
 Thầy Mù Xem Voi (Blind Soothsayers Examining an Elephant; in two parts) 1990
 Phiên chợ tình (Love Market) 1992
 Một Cõi Tâm Linh (A Spiritual Realm) 1993
 Có Một Làng Quê (There Was a Village) 1994
 Chuyện Từ Một Góc Công Viên (A Story From a Corner of the Park) 1996
 Hải Hậu—Một Vùng Quê Văn Hoá (The Rural Culture of Hải Hậu) 1998
 Huế—Những di tích xưa (Remnants of Former Days in Huế) 1999
 Huế—Lịch sử (History in Huế) 1999
 Huế—Văn Hóa (The Culture of Huế) 1999
 Tiếng Vĩ Cầm Ở Mỹ Lai (The Sound of a Violin at Mỹ Lai) 1999
 Giáo Sư Hoàng Minh Giám (Professor Hoàng Minh Giám) 2000
 Nhà Thờ Phát Diệm (The Phát Diệm Cathedral) 2001
 Lời Của Đá (The Stones Speak) 2004
 Mạn Đàm Về Người Man Di Hiện Đại (Conversations Concerning a Barbarian of Modern Times; in 4 parts) 2008
 Vọng Khúc Ngàn Năm (Songs Resounding for a Thousand Years; in three parts) 2013

Filmscripts
 Nhà Giáo Nguyễn Lân, 2001
 Alexander Yersin, 2015

Films with contributions by Trần Văn Thủy
 Hoà Bình Cho Việt Nam (participating director; made for ABC Australia) 1991
 Nam, Retour sur image (participating director; made for Quak Productions, France) 1999

Books
 Nếu Đi Hết Biển (If You Go to the Ends of All the Seas); 2003
 Chuyện Nghề Của Thủy (Thủy's Craft; written with Lê Thanh Dũng); 2013. This is a set of professional memoirs.
 In Whose Eyes: The Memoir of a Vietnamese Filmmaker in War and Peace (a considerably rearranged English version of Chuyện Nghề Của Thủy, above); University of Massachusetts Press, 2016; 
 Trong Đống Tra Tàn (Amid the Heap of Dusty Ashes); 2016
 Wayne Karlin, War Movies: Journeys to Vietnam, Curbstone Press, 2005;

Notes

Works cited

Living people
Vietnamese film directors
1940 births
Vietnamese documentary film directors
Vietnamese expatriates in the Soviet Union